Anthony Raymond Mallock (born 12 April 1951 in Barton on Sea) is a British former racing driver.

He competed in the British Formula One Championship from 1978 to 1980.

He is chairman of RML Group, the motorsport and automotive engineering group he founded.

Racing record

Complete European Formula Two Championship results
(key) (Races in bold indicate pole position; races in italics indicate fastest lap)

Complete Shellsport International Series results
(key) (Races in bold indicate pole position; races in italics indicate fastest lap)

Complete British Formula One Championship results
(key) (Races in bold indicate pole position; races in italics indicate fastest lap.)

24 Hours of Le Mans results

References

1951 births
Living people
British racing drivers
British Formula One drivers
British Formula One Championship drivers
European Formula Two Championship drivers
24 Hours of Le Mans drivers
World Sportscar Championship drivers

Ecurie Ecosse drivers